New England Revolution II is a professional soccer club based in the Greater Boston area that competes in the MLS Next Pro, the third division of American soccer. The team is owned by, and operates as the reserve team of the Major League Soccer club New England Revolution. The team plays at Gillette Stadium. The team was announced as a member of League One on October 9, 2019.

History 
On October 9, 2019, the New England Revolution announced the formation of a reserve team in USL League One that would begin play in the 2020 season and that they would play at Gillette Stadium in Foxborough. On November 25, 2019, the club announced its first manager, Clint Peay.

MLS Next Pro
The club announced on December 6, 2021, that it was joining the inaugural 21-team MLS Next Pro season starting in 2022.

Players and staff

Current roster

Staff

Statistics and records

Year-by-year

Head coaches record

See also 
 New England Revolution
 USL League One
 MLS Next Pro

References

External links 
 

 
Association football clubs established in 2019
Former USL League One teams
2019 establishments in Massachusetts
New England Revolution
MLS Next Pro teams
Reserve soccer teams in the United States